Brian Carr-Hartley (born 22 April 1938) is a Kenyan former sports shooter. He competed in the trap event at the 1972 Summer Olympics.

References

1938 births
Living people
Kenyan male sport shooters
Olympic shooters of Kenya
Shooters at the 1972 Summer Olympics
Place of birth missing (living people)